is a railway station in the city of Higashimatsushima, Miyagi Prefecture, Japan, operated by East Japan Railway Company (JR East).

Lines
Kazuma Station is served by the Senseki Line. It is located 37.6 rail kilometers from the terminus of the Senseki Line at Aoba-dōri Station.

Station layout
The station has one side platform serving a single bi-directional track. The station is unattended.

History
Kazuma Station opened on June 1, 1929 as a station on the Miyagi Electric Railway.  The Miyagi Electric Railway was nationalized on May 1, 1944. Operations were suspended for a one-year period between June 10, 1945 and June 10, 1946. The station was absorbed into the JR East network upon the privatization of JNR on April 1, 1987.

The station was closed from March 11, 2011 due to damage to the line associated with the 2011 Tōhoku earthquake and tsunami, and services were replaced by provisional bus services.

Surrounding area

Makabe Hospital

See also
 List of railway stations in Japan

References

External links

 

Railway stations in Miyagi Prefecture
Senseki Line
Railway stations in Japan opened in 1929
Higashimatsushima, Miyagi
Stations of East Japan Railway Company